Eugene Burnstein is an American social psychologist and professor emeritus of psychology at the University of Michigan College of Literature, Science, and the Arts. He is also a senior research scientist emeritus at the University of Michigan Institute for Social Research. He is known for his research on the cognitive bases of social influence and group decision-making.

References

External links
Faculty page
Profile at Social Psychology Network

Living people
University of Michigan faculty
University of Pennsylvania alumni
University of Michigan alumni
American social psychologists
University of Texas at Austin faculty
Michigan State University faculty
Year of birth missing (living people)
American psychologists